Shahzada Iftikhar Uddin (born 15 August 1969) is a Pakistani politician who was a member of the National Assembly of Pakistan from June 2013 to May 2018.

Early life and education
Uddin was born on 15 August 1969 in Chitral to Shahzada Mohiuddin. He received his Bachelor of Arts from the State University of New York, his Bachelor of Science in Business Administration from the University of Wisconsin–Whitewater and his Master of Business Administration in International Business from the University of Birmingham.

Political career
Uddin ran for the seat of the National Assembly of Pakistan as a candidate of Pakistan Muslim League (Q) from Constituency NA-32 (Chitral) in 2002 Pakistani general election, but was unsuccessful and lost the seat to a candidate of Muttahida Majlis-e-Amal.

He was elected to the National Assembly as a candidate of All Pakistan Muslim League (APML) from Constituency NA-32 (Chitral) in 2013 Pakistani general election, despite the boycott of the election by the APML.

Electoral history

2002

2013

2018

References 

1969 births
Living people
People from Chitral
Chitrali people
Pakistani MNAs 2013–2018